Sonya McGinn (born 17 December 1973) is an Irish former badminton player. She competed at the 2000 Summer Olympics in Sydney, Australia, became the first Irish player in badminton at the Summer Olympics. The Howth women lost in the second round to Mia Audina of the Netherlands, former silver medalist in 1996 Atlanta in the straight games. McGinn had won 9 times National Championships title, 5 in the women's singles and 4 in the women's doubles event.

Achievements

IBF International 
Women's singles

Women's doubles

References

External links 
 
 

1977 births
Living people
Sportspeople from County Dublin
Irish female badminton players
Badminton players at the 2000 Summer Olympics
Olympic badminton players of Ireland